Kepler-445d is an exoplanet orbiting the red dwarf Kepler-445 every 8 days possibly in the circumstellar habitable zone. PHL does not consider this planet potentially habitable.

Physical characteristics
Kepler-445d is only slightly larger than the Earth, with a radius of 1.33 R🜨. According to PHL's calculators, the mass required for the planet to have the same density as the Earth is around 2 M🜨.

References

Cygnus (constellation)
445d
Exoplanets discovered in 2015
Transiting exoplanets